Stampede is a studio album by Critters Buggin of Seattle, Washington recorded and released in 2004. Although categorized as jazz, funk and rock reviews of Stampede mostly noted it as unique and boundary defying. Reviews also described it as similar to the electronic period of Miles Davis. Dave Segal of The Stranger stated the album "take(s) rewarding detours down psychedelic jazz corridors and non-kitsch exotica parlours."

Track listing
 "Hojo" - 4:27
 "Panang" - 5:54
 "Cloudburst" - 4:07
 "Sisa Boto" - 3:46
 "Persephone Under Mars" - 5:12
 "We are New People" - 6:34
 "Toad Garden" - 4:18
 "Punk Rock Guilt" - 3:22
 "Nasty Gnostic" - 5:02
 "Dorothy" - 3:30
 "Open the Door of Peace" - 6:50

Personnel
Matt Chamberlain - drums, percussion, programming and synths
Skerik - tenor and baritone saxophones, Rhodes electric piano, acoustic grand piano, analog synths, distortion and effects
Mike Dillon - percussion and vibes
Brad Houser - bass
Stone Gossard - synth - track 7
 Gus: guitar - track 7
Jon Brion - piano - track 9, guitar - track 11
Bachir and Mustapha Attar from Master Musicians of Jajouka - track 11
Eyvind Kang - string arrangements - tracks 2, 5, 10

References

2004 albums
Critters Buggin albums
Ropeadope Records albums
Albums produced by Matt Chamberlain